Ann Lloyd  may refer to:

Emily Ann Lloyd, American actress
Ann Lloyd Keen, British politician
Anne Aston, née Lloyd, British actress